Eric Harris (1981–1999) was one of the perpetrators of the Columbine High School massacre.

Eric Harris may also refer to:

Eric Harris (gridiron football) (1955–2012), NFL player
Eric Harris (rugby league) (1910–?), rugby league footballer who played in the 1920s and 1930s for Western Suburbs and Leeds
Eric Harris (athlete) (born 1991), American sprinter
 Eric Courtney Harris (1970/1–2015), African-American who was a victim of a police shooting in Oklahoma

See also
 Erick Harris (born 1982), American football player
 Erik Harris (born 1990), American football player
 Eric Harrison (disambiguation)